Punata is the capital of Punata Province and Punata Municipality in Cochabamba Department, Bolivia. At the time of census 2012 it had a population of 19,559 inhabitants  and at the census 2012 the populations rose to 28.707 inhabitants.
People from Punata and surrounding areas used to be called “Vallunos” meaning coming from the valleys of Punata and other surrounding small towns.  Punata is renowned for its wonderful agricultural market held every Tuesday where people from surrounding towns and rural villages come to sell and buy.

See also
 Irrigation in alluvial fans including the alluvial fan of Punata

References

External links
Map of Punata Province

Populated places in Cochabamba Department